County Roscommon was a UK Parliament constituency in Ireland. The constituency sent two MPs to Westminster from the Act of Union 1800 until the constituency was split into Roscommon North and Roscommon South in 1885.

Boundaries
This constituency comprised the whole of County Roscommon.

Members of Parliament

Elections

Elections in the 1830s

O'Connor's death caused a by-election.

Elections in the 1840s

O'Connor was appointed a Lord Commissioner of the Treasury, requiring a by-election.

Elections in the 1850s

Elections in the 1860s
On petition, Goff was unseated and a by-election was called.

Elections in the 1870s
French's death caused a by-election

Elections in the 1880s

References

The Parliaments of England by Henry Stooks Smith (1st edition published in three volumes 1844–50), 2nd edition edited (in one volume) by F.W.S. Craig (Political Reference Publications 1973)

See also
Roscommon (Dáil constituency)

Westminster constituencies in County Roscommon (historic)
Constituencies of the Parliament of the United Kingdom established in 1801
Constituencies of the Parliament of the United Kingdom disestablished in 1885